Erik Tutein Poulsson (12 January 1897 – 1978) was a Norwegian lawyer, resistance member and civil servant.

Personal life
Poulsson was born in Kristiania on 12 January 1897 to medical doctor Edvard Poulsson and Anna Sophie Tutein. He married Ingrid Plene in 1931. His sister Eva Antoinette was married to psychiatrist Gabriel Langfeldt.

Career
Poulsson graduated as cand.jur. in 1919, and was barrister with access to work with the Supreme Court from 1927. During the German occupation of Norway he represented the jurists in the coordination committee of the civil resistance movement from 1941 to 1944. For a period he served as treasurer for Milorg. He later chaired the Security service at the Norwegian legation in Stockholm. From 1945 to 1952 he managed the Directorate for Enemy Property. He was a board member of Norsk Hydro from 1946 to 1967.

Awards and legacy
Poulsson was decorated Knight, First Class of the Order of St. Olav in 1953. He was a Knight of the Danish Order of Dannebrog, a Knight of the Swedish Order of the Polar Star, and Officer of the French Legion of Honour.

References 

1897 births
1978 deaths
Lawyers from Oslo
Civil servants from Oslo
Norwegian resistance members
Directors of government agencies of Norway
Officiers of the Légion d'honneur
20th-century Norwegian lawyers